The 19th edition of the Men's Asian Amateur Boxing Championships were held from 25 to 31 August 1997, in Kuala Lumpur, Malaysia.

Medal summary

Medal table

References
amateur-boxing

External links
Complete Results

1997
Asian Boxing
Boxing
International sports competitions hosted by Malaysia
Boxing in Malaysia